A  is a member of, usually, a Japanese tokusatsu production who works similar to a stunt performer. However, the suit actor does all of his or her stunts while in a full costume that normally obscures their identity (typically the transformed character) from the viewer, and the actor's voice is  dubbed during .

List of notable suit actors
Javier Botet

Kevin Peter Hall (Most famous for his portrayal of Yautja from Predator from 1987 to 1990)
Verne Troyer (Ferbus in Saban's Masked Rider)
 (Most famous for his portrayal of Godzilla from 1954 to 1972)

 (Most famous for his portrayal of Godzilla from 1984 to 1995, Hedorah from Godzilla vs. Hedorah and Gigan from Godzilla vs. Gigan)

 (under the stage name )
 (Most famous for his portrayal of Shishi Ranger from Gosei Sentai Dairanger and Godzilla from 1999 to 2004)
Brian Steele
Tom Woodruff Jr. (Most famous for his portrayal of Xenomorph from 1992 to 2007)
Ian Whyte (Most famous for his portrayal of Yautja from Alien vs. Predator from 2004 to 2007)
 (Most famous for his portrayal of King Ghidorah from Ghidorah, the Three-Headed Monster and King Kong from King Kong vs. Godzilla).

See also
Tokusatsu
Stunt performer
Creature suit

References 

Tokusatsu